Candle March is an Indian Marathi language film directed by Sachin Deo and produced by Anjali Thatte-Gawde and Nilesh Gawde. The film stars Manva Naik, Smita Tambe ,Tejaswini Pandit and Sayali Sahastrabuddhe.  The film was released on 5 December 2014.

Synopsis 
Inspired by true events, Candle March follows the struggles of four young women who were sexually harassed, charting out the events that connected and empowered them to fight injustice and a biased system.

Cast 
 Manva Naik as Vidya
 Smita Tambe as Shabana
 Tejaswini Pandit as Anurata 
 Sayali Sahastrabuddhe as Sakshi 
 Nilesh Diwekar
 Ashish Kulkarni
 Ashish Patode
 Chandrakant Lokare

Soundtrack

Critical response 
Candle March received positive reviews from critics. Mihir Bhanage of The Times of India rated the film 3 out of 5 stars and syas "Because of these two elements the film doesn’t feel lengthy. The final monologue by Tejaswini Pandit hits all the right chords and is worth pondering upon". Ganesh Matkari of Pune Mirror wrote "the film has a capacity to disturb and the issues are very real. For this fact, and this fact alone, I will not hesitate in recommending it". A reviewer from Divya Marathi wrote "The candle march at the end of the film is not given much importance. Even so, while presenting the sensitive topic forcefully, there is not only the empty optimism that the mentality of the society should be changed, but also the direction of what and what changes should be made". Soumitra Pote of Maharashtra Times rated the film 2.5 out of 5 stars and wrote "The overall effort for this film is sincere. Due to increase in length, it crawls in the middle. His behavior makes him very childish at times. One thing is for sure that this movie is not just entertaining. The film makes its point firmly".

References

External links
 

2014 films
2010s Marathi-language films
Indian drama films